Yuxarı Aybasanlı is a village in the Fuzuli District of Azerbaijan. The village was occupied by Armenian forces since the First Nagorno-Karabakh war until its recapture on 20 October 2020.

References

External links 
 

Populated places in Fuzuli District